Tassilo I (or Tassilon) (560 – 610) was Duke of Bavaria from 591 to his death. According to Paul the Deacon, he was appointed as Bavarian rex by Childebert II, Frankish king of Austrasia, in 591, ending the war with the Franks. The war began during the reign of Tassilo's predecessor, Garibald I, when Garibald concluded a marriage alliance with the Lombards. We do not know whether Garibald died or was deposed. Nor do we know Tassilo's exact relationship to Garibald, though we can assume Tassilo was a close relation if not his son. The fact that Childebert named Tassilo duke shows Frankish control over the Bavarian state.

Paul the Deacon also tells us that Tassilo soon moved into the lands of the Slavs (probably the recently conquered eastern Tyrol and  Carinthia), and returned victorious with much plunder. This victory proved to be short-lived as Paul tells us of 2,000 Bavarians, who were slain to the last man in 595. They had invaded the lands of the Slavs, who received help from the Kaghan (chief) of the Avars.

Tassilo died in 610 and was succeeded by his son Garibald II.

Sources
Störmer, Wilhelm. "Die Baiuwaren: Von der Völkerwanderung bis Tassilo III." pp 64 – 66, Verlag C. H. Beck, 2002, .
Paul the Deacon, History of the Lombards: Book 4 , Chapter VII

560 births
610 deaths
6th-century dukes of Bavaria
7th-century dukes of Bavaria
Agilolfings